Jörg Widmann (born 19 June 1973) is a German composer, conductor and clarinetist. In 2018, Widmann was the third most performed contemporary composer in the world. Formerly a clarinet and composition professor at the University of Music Freiburg, he is composition professor at the Barenboim–Said Akademie. His most important compositions are the two operas Babylon and Das Gesicht im Spiegel, an oratorio Arche, his string quartets and the concert overture Con brio. Widmann wrote musical tributes to Classical and Romantic composers. He was awarded the Bavarian Maximilian Order for Science and Art in 2018. He is the brother of a German classical violinist Carolin Widmann.

Education and career 
Widmann was born on 19 June 1973 in Munich, the son of a physicist and a teacher. He first took clarinet lessons in 1980. Four years later he became a composition student of Kay Westermann. Widmann attended the secondary school  in Munich. He later studied composition with Hans Werner Henze, Wilfried Hiller, Heiner Goebbels and Wolfgang Rihm. He studied as a clarinetist at the Hochschule für Musik und Theater München with Gerhard Starke (1986–1997, Meisterklassendiplom 1997) and at the Juilliard School in New York City with Charles Neidich (1994–1995, Advanced Certificate 1995). After graduating with a Master's from Hochschule für Musik Munich in 1997, he furthered his studies at the Hochschule für Musik Karlsruhe (1997–1999). From 2001 to 2015, he taught clarinet as a professor at the University of Music Freiburg. From 2009 to 2016 Widmann was a part-time Professor of Composition, succeeding Mathias Spahlinger, at the Institute for New Music at the University of Music Freiburg. From 2011 to 2017, Widmann was Principal Guest Conductor and from 2017 to 2022, Principal Conductor and Artistic Partner of the Irish Chamber Orchestra. Since 2017, Widmann has held the Edward-Said-Chair as Professor of Composition at the Barenboim–Said Akademie, Berlin. Since 2022, he has been Associated Conductor of the Munich Chamber Orchestra.

He lives in Berlin and Munich.

Musical works and performances 
Widmann has achieved success both as a clarinetist and as a composer.

Clarinet career 
As a soloist, Widmann has performed with major orchestras in Germany and abroad, including the Vienna Philharmonic Orchestra and Munich Philharmonic Orchestra, under conductors like Valery Gergiev, Christoph von Dohnányi, Sylvain Cambreling and Kent Nagano. He has premiered several clarinet concerti dedicated to him: in 1999 through "musica viva", he played Music for Clarinet and Orchestra by Wolfgang Rihm; in 2006 with the WDR Symphony Orchestra, Cantus by Aribert Reimann; and in 2015 "über" by Mark Andre at the Donaueschingen Festival. Widmann's core repertoire as clarinetist includes Pierre Boulez's Dialogue de l'ombre double, which he performed on Boulez's 85th birthday in Paris.

Career as composer 
Widmann's compositions draw on different musical genres. For example, he has written a trilogy for orchestra examining the projection of vocal forms of instrumental ensembles. The trilogy consists of Lied (premiered in 2003 and recorded on CD by the Bamberg Symphony with Jonathan Nott), Chor (premiered in 2004 by the Deutsches Symphonie-Orchester Berlin with Kent Nagano) and Messe (premiered in June 2005 by the Munich Philharmonic under Christian Thielemann). In 2007, Pierre Boulez and the Vienna Philharmonic premiered his orchestral work Armonica.

His early string quartets are of particular note among his chamber music: the First Quartet was written in 1997, followed by the Chorale Quartet and the Hunting Quartet, the latter premiered in 2003 by the Arditti Quartet. 2005 saw the first performances of the Fourth Quartet and Experiment on a Fugue (Fifth Quartet, with soprano), with Juliane Banse and the Artemis Quartet. These five one-movement quartets form a cycle.

Widmann was Composer in Residence at the Salzburg Festival and at the chamber music festival Spannungen, Heimbach in 2004. Octet was premiered on 4 June 2004 at the power plant Kraftwerk Heimbach. Widmann premiered Am Anfang by Anselm Kiefer in July 2009 as part of the 20th anniversary of the Opéra Bastille, in which he acted as composer, clarinetist and made his debut as conductor. He was Composer in Residence at the Lucerne Festival in 2009, where on 13 August 2009, Heinz Holliger performed Widmann's oboe concerto, commissioned by the festival. On 5 September Widmann premiered Holliger's Rechant for solo clarinet. Widmann's Free Pieces for Ensemble: Number X is used in Sophie Fiennes's documentary Over Your Cities Grass Will Grow (2010), about the postwar German artist Anselm Kiefer. His sister Carolin Widmann premiered his études IV-VI for violin (20042010) at the Wittener Tage für neue Kammermusik on 23 April 2010. From 2009 to 2011 he was the Daniel R. Lewis Young Composer Fellow at the Cleveland Orchestra. He performed his Fantasie for Solo Clarinet (1993) to celebrate Walter Fink's 80th birthday at the Rheingau Musik Festival on 16 August 2010 and in 2014 was the festival's Composer and Artist in Residence. Widmann was the Tonhalle Orchester Zürich's Creative Chair in the 2015–16 season.

On 9 September 2015, the Boston Symphony Orchestra and the Leipzig Gewandhaus Orchestra announced they were commissioning a work from Widmann as part of a planned collaboration by the two organizations beginning in the fall of 2017. The Leipzig Gewandhaus Orchestra announced Widmann's appointment as its first-ever Gewandhauskomponist (Gewandhaus composer) for the 2017–18 season.

Widmann's oratorio ARCHE had its world premiere on 13 January 2017 on the occasion of the opening festivities of the Elbphilharmonie in Hamburg. The Hamburg Philharmonic State Orchestra conducted by Kent Nagano performed it. A concert by Widmann, Daniel Barenboim, and Anna Prohaska opened the Pierre Boulez Saal on 4 March 2017.

On 27 January 2018 Widmann and the Hagen Quartet performed his Clarinet Quintet, as part of a European tour, at Amsterdam's Muziekgebouw aan het IJ. Partita, five reminiscences for large orchestra, commissioned by the Leipzig Gewandhaus Orchestra and the Boston Symphony Orchestra, was premiered in Leipzig on 8 March 2018 with Andris Nelsons conducting.

After the world premiere in 2012 at the Bavarian State Opera, in 2019 a new Berlin version of his opera Babylon was performed at the Berlin State Opera on Unter den Linden under the musical direction of Christopher Ward.

Anne-Sophie Mutter is the dedicatee of String Quartet No. 6 (Study on Beethoven, 2019). With this piece, Widmann began a new series of works in the genre.

Widmann held the 2019–20 Richard and Barbara Debs Composer's Chair at Carnegie Hall. During the COVID-19 pandemic of 2020, he contributed to the online Festival of New Music with his composition empty space. Barenboim and Emanuel Pahud curated the festival in the empty Pierre Boulez Saal.

Musical style 
Sounds, not tones, are the focus of Widmann's thinking. His music integrates serialism and noise in traditional sources. In most of his compositions, Widmann is in a musical "dialogue" with Classical-Romantic composers such as Schumann, Mozart, Beethoven, Schubert and Brahms. He wrote musical tributes to these composers. Widmann has written pieces without pitches and also purely tonal pieces with exaggerated familiar gestures. The scores show extremely precise, well-considered structures and instructions. He uses extended techniques in many compositions, such as Con brio. He finds inspiration in literature, poems, paintings and sculptures and frequently uses literary sources for his compositions, like Matthias Claudius, Klabund, Heinrich Heine, Peter Sloterdijk, Clemens Brentano and Friedrich Schiller.

According to Bachtrack, Widmann was the third most performed contemporary composer in the world in 2018, behind Arvo Pärt and John Williams.

Awards 
 1996 
 1997 Bayerischer Staatspreis für junge Künstler
 1999 Belmont Prize for Contemporary Music from the Forberg-Schneider Foundation
 2002 Hindemith Prize of the Schleswig-Holstein Musik Festival
 2002 Schneider-Schott Music Prize
 2003 Ernst von Siemens Composers' Prize
 2003–2004 award of the magazine Opernwelt: "most important premiere of the season: Das Gesicht im Spiegel"
 2004 Arnold Schönberg Prize
 2006 Kompositionspreis of the SWR Sinfonieorchester Baden-Baden und Freiburg for Second Labyrinth
 2006 Claudio-Abbado-Kompositionspreis of the Orchester-Akademie of the Berlin Philharmonic for Quintet for oboe, clarinet, horn, bassoon and piano
 2007 Prize of the Christoph and Stephan Kaske Foundation
 2009 Stoeger Prize of the New York Chamber Music Society
 2010 Marsilius Medal of the Heidelberg University
 2013 Heidelberger Frühling Music Award
 2013 German Music Authors' Prize (Composition Symphonic)
 2018 Robert Schumann Prize for Poetry and Music Mainz
 2018 Bavarian Maximilian Order for Science and Art
 2019 , "Composer of the year" for ARCHE
 2021 Musikpreis der Landeshauptstadt München
 2021 Würth Prize of Jeunesses Musicales Germany
 2023 Honorary doctorate University of Limerick

Memberships 
 2003 Fellow of the Berlin Institute for Advanced Study
 2005 Member of the Bayerische Akademie der Schönen Künste
 2007 Member of the Freie Akademie der Künste Hamburg
 2007 Member of the Deutsche Akademie der Darstellenden Künste
 2016 Member of the Akademie der Wissenschaften und der Literatur Mainz

Works 
Widmann's works are published by Schott Music.

 Absences, Schuloper (1990)
 Kreisleriana, concert piece for violin and chamber orchestra (1993)
 Fantasie for Solo Clarinet (1993)
 First String Quartet (1997)
 Five Fragments for clarinet and piano (1997)
 Nachtstück (Nightpiece) for piano, clarinet and cello (1998)
 Fever Fantasy for piano, string quartet and clarinet (with bass clarinet) (1999)
 Implosion for orchestra (2001)
 Light Study I for orchestra (2001)
 ad absurdum for trumpet and small orchestra (2002)
 Free Pieces for ensemble (2002)
 Toccata for piano (2002)
 Second String Quartet (Chorale Quartet) (2003)
 Hall Study for piano (2003)
 Das Gesicht im Spiegel (The Face in the Mirror), opera in 16 scenes, libretto by Roland Schimmelpfennig (2003)
 Third String Quartet (Hunting Quartet) (2003)
 Lied for orchestra (2003)
 Chor for orchestra (2004)
 Skeleton for percussion (2004)
 Light Studies (I-VI) for violin, viola, accordion, clarinet, piano and orchestra (2004)
 Octet for clarinet, horn, bassoon, 2 violins, viola, cello and double bass (2004)
 Fourth String Quartet (2005)
 Experiment on a Fugue (Fifth String Quartet with soprano) (2005)
 Messe for full orchestra (2005)
 Air for horn solo (2005)
 Labyrinth for 48 chordophones (2005)
 Elegy for clarinet and orchestra (2006)
 Echo-Fragments for clarinet and orchestral groups (2006)
 Second Labyrinth for orchestral groups (2006)
 Armonica for glass harmonica and orchestra (2007)
 Violin Concerto (2007)
 Con brio for orchestra (2008)
 Antiphon for orchestral group (2008)
 Oboe Concerto (2009)
 Flûte en suite for flute and orchestral groups (2011)
 Babylon, opera in 7 scenes, libretto by Peter Sloterdijk (2011–2012,  2018)
 Third Labyrinth for soprano and orchestral groups (2013–2014)
 Trauermarsch (Funeral March) for piano and orchestra (2014)
 Viola Concerto (2015)
 Once upon a time..., five pieces in fairy-tale style for clarinet, viola and piano (2015)
 ARCHE, oratorio for soloists, choirs, organ and orchestra (2016)
 Sonatina facile for piano (2016)
 Clarinet Quintet (2017)
 Partita, five reminiscences for large orchestra (2017–2018)
 Violin Concerto No. 2 (2018)
 Labyrinth IV for soprano and ensemble (2019)
 Study on Beethoven (String Quartet No. 6) (2019)
 String Quartet No. 7, 8, 9, 10 (Cavatina) (Study on Beethoven II, III, IV, V) (2019/2020)
 empty space for five players (flute, clarinet, percussion, piano and violin) (2020)
 Zeitensprünge, 450 bars for orchestra (2019,  2020)
 Towards Paradise (Labyrinth VI) for trumpet and orchestra (2021)
 Danse macabre for orchestra (2022)

Discography 
 Lied, Jonathan Nott, Bamberg Symphony (Tudor Records 2005) 
 String Quartets, Leipzig String Quartet (MDG 2008)  
 Violin Concerto, Antiphon, Insel der Sirenen, Christian Tetzlaff, Daniel Harding, Swedish Radio Symphony Orchestra (Ondine 2013) 
 String Quartet No. 3 (Hunting Quartet) (with Haydn and Schubert Quartets), Ragazze Quartet (Channel Classics 2013)
 Armonica, Antiphon, Souvenir bavarois, Paavo Järvi, Frankfurt Radio Symphony Orchestra (Pan Classics 2014) 
 Con brio (with Beethoven: Symphony No. 7 & 8), Mariss Jansons, Bavarian Radio Symphony Orchestra (BR-Klassik 2015) This CD edition was awarded the Choc Classica 2013. 
 String Quartets, Minguet Quartet (Wergo 2015)  
 Viola Concerto, Duos, Hunting Quartet, Antoine Tamestit, Signum Quartet, Daniel Harding, Bavarian Radio Symphony Orchestra (Harmonia Mundi 2018) 
 Arche, Marlis Petersen, Iveta Apkalna, Kent Nagano, Philharmonisches Staatsorchester Hamburg (ECM 2018)  
 Diabelli Variation (with Beethoven, et al.: The Diabelli Project), Rudolf Buchbinder, (Deutsche Grammophon 2020)

Recordings as clarinetist 
 Rihm: Vier Studien zu einem Klarinettenquintett, Vier Male, Jörg Widmann, Minguet Quartet (Ars Musici 2004)  
 Rihm: Music for Clarinet and Orchestra, Jörg Widmann, Sylvain Cambreling, SWR Sinfonieorchester Baden-Baden und Freiburg (SWRmusic 2010) 
 Elegie, Messe, Five Fragments, Jörg Widmann, Heinz Holliger, Christoph Poppen, Deutsche Radio Philharmonie Saarbrücken Kaiserslautern (ECM 2011) 
 Brahms: Clarinet Quintet, Jörg Widmann, Hagen Quartet (Myrios 2012) 
 Mozart: Clarinet Quintet, Jörg Widmann, Arcanto Quartet (Harmonia Mundi 2013)  
 Three Shadow Dances (with Mozart: Clarinet Concerto, Weber: Clarinet Concerto No. 1), Jörg Widmann, Peter Ruzicka, Deutsches Symphonie-Orchester Berlin (Orfeo 2016)  
 Once upon a time... (with Schumann: Märchenerzählungen), Tabea Zimmermann, Jörg Widmann,  (Myrios 2016) Opus Klassik 2018, ICMA Winner 2019 – Chamber music, Diapason d'Or de l'Année 2018 Winner – Musique de chambre  
 Polyphonic Shadows (Light Study II), Third Labyrinth, Christophe Desjardins, Jörg Widmann, Heinz Holliger, Emilio Pomárico, WDR Symphony Orchestra Cologne (Wergo 2018)  
 Intermezzi, Brahms Clarinet Sonatas, András Schiff, Jörg Widmann (ECM New Series 2020)  Opus Klassik – Chamber music recording of the year

Recordings as conductor 
 ad absurdum (with Mendelssohn: Symphonien No. 1 & 4), Sergei Nakariakov, Jörg Widmann, Irish Chamber Orchestra (Orfeo 2016)  
 Experiment on a Fugue (with Mendelssohn: Symphony No. 5 "Reformation"), Mojca Erdmann, Jörg Widmann, Irish Chamber Orchestra (Orfeo 2017)  
 180 beats per minute, Fantasie (with Mendelssohn: Symphony No. 3 "Scottish", The Hebrides), Jörg Widmann, Irish Chamber Orchestra (Orfeo 2018)

Writings

References

Citations

Bibliography

Films

Further reading

External links 

  
 Jörg Widmann at Schott Music
 
 Jörg Widmann Harrison Parrott (agents)
 Jörg Widmann Salzburg Festival
 

1973 births
20th-century classical composers
21st-century classical composers
21st-century German conductors (music)
Composers for piano
Contemporary classical music performers
Ernst von Siemens Composers' Prize winners
German classical clarinetists
German male conductors (music)
German male classical composers
German opera composers
Academic staff of the Hochschule für Musik Freiburg
Hochschule für Musik Karlsruhe alumni
University of Music and Performing Arts Munich alumni
Juilliard School alumni
Living people
Male opera composers
Musicians from Munich
String quartet composers
20th-century German composers
21st-century German composers
20th-century clarinetists
21st-century clarinetists
20th-century German male musicians
21st-century German male musicians